Colin Cheney (born 1978 Boston, Massachusetts) is an American poet.

His debut collection, Here Be Monsters, was selected for the National Poetry Series in 2009. His work has appeared in many publications including American Poetry Review, Crazyhorse, Gulf Coast, Kenyon Review, Massachusetts Review, Ploughshares, Poetry Magazine. He is an editor of Tongue: A Journal of Writing & Art.

He graduated from Brown University, with a BA in Environmental Studies in 2001. In 2007, he received an MFA from New York University.

He lives in Portland, Maine USA where works as a visiting instructor at the Maine College of Art. He is the brother of film producer Ian Cheney.

Awards
2006 Ruth Lilly Fellowships 
2009 National Poetry Series
2010 Pushcart Prize for the poem "Lord God Bird"

Works
"Half-Ourselves & Half-Not", Poetry (September 2009)
"Ars Poetica with Vulture", Kenyon Review
"Hanging Garden", "Guernica: A Journal of Writing & Art" (with audio)
"Observatory", "Waccamaw: A Journal of Contemporary Literature"
Here Be Monsters (The University of Georgia Press, 2010)

References

External links

American male poets
Writers from Boston
1978 births
Brown University alumni
Living people
21st-century American poets
21st-century American male writers